Final Hour may refer to:

 "Final Hour", a 2016 song by Bastille from Wild World
 "Final Hour", a 1998 song by Lauryn Hill from The Miseducation of Lauryn Hill